The Tolupan or Jicaque people are an indigenous ethnic group of Honduras, primarily inhabiting the northwest coast of Honduras and the community  in central Honduras.

Culture
The Jicaque or Tolupan are an agrarian people, who raise beans, maize, and sweet and bitter manioc. They also fish, hunt, and raise livestock. They are polygamous. Culturally, they are similar to the Miskito and Sumo people.

History
In the 19th century, a Roman Catholic missionary, Manuel Jesús de Subirian, encouraged many Jicaque to assimilate into mainstream culture, settle in villages, and grow maize. The other Jicaque who maintained their traditional lifeways lived in Montaña de la Flor, and ultimately the Honduran government granted them a 760-hectare reservation.

Synonymy
The Jicaque are also called the Cicaque, Hicaque, Ikake, Taguaca, Taupane, Tol, Tolpan, Torrupan, or Xicaque people.

Honors
A species of Honduran snake, Rhadinella tolpanorum, is named in honor of the Tolupan people.

Notes

Further reading 
Chapman, Anne (1984). "Tolupan de la Montaña de la  flor: otra cultura que desaparece". America Indigena 44 (3): 467-484. (in Spanish).
Chapman, Anne (1981). "Organizacion dual entre los jicaques (tol) de la Montaña de la Flor, Honduras".  Yaxkin 4 (1): 57-67. (in Spanish).
Chapman, Anne (1978). "Les Enfants des la Mort: Univers Mythique des Indiens Tolupan (Jicaque)". Mission Archaeologique et Ethnologique Français Au Mexique. (in French).
Chapman, Anne (1970). "Chamanisme et magie des ficelles chez les Tolupan (Jicaque) du Honduras". Journal de la Societé des Américanistes 59: 43-64. (in French).
Chavez Borjas, Manuel (1984)." Cultura jicaque y el proyecto de desarrollo indigena en Yoro". America Indigena 44 (3): 589-612. (in Spanish).
Davidson, William (1984). "Padre Subirana y las tierras concedidas a los indios hondureños en el siglo XIX ". America Indigena 44 (3): 447-459. (in Spanish).
Davidson, William. (1985) "Geografía de los indígenas toles (jicaques) de Honduras en el siglo  XVIII " [= "Geography of the Tol (Jicaque) Indians in eighteenth century Honduras"].  Mesoamerica 9: 58-90. (in Spanish).
Royce de Denis, Margaret (1986). "Programa de alfabetizacion bilingue entre los Tolupanes de la Montaña de la flor ". Yaxkin 9: 17-28. (in Spanish).
Steward, Julian H (1948). Handbook of South American Indians, Volume 4: The Circum-Caribbean Tribes. Smithsonian Institution, Bureau of American Ethnology, Bulletin 143, 60-61.
von Hagen, Victor (1943). The Jicaque (Torupan) Indians of Honduras.  Indian Notes and Monographs 53. New York: Heye Foundation.

Circum-Caribbean tribes
Indigenous peoples in Honduras
Indigenous peoples of Central America
Mesoamerican cultures